In Danger and Deep Distress, the Middleway Spells Certain Death is a 1974 drama film directed by Alexander Kluge and Edgar Reitz. It is set in Frankfurt and tells the story of two women, one who sleeps with many men and steals their wallets, and one who is a spy for East Germany. The film mimics the style of documentaries, with actual documentary footage from the city as well as essayistic aspects.

It was released in Germany on 18 December 1974. It received the Deutscher Filmpreis for Best Editing and Best Musical Dramaturgy.

Cast
 Dagmar Bödderich as Inge Maier
 Jutta Winkelmann as Rita Müller-Eisert
  as Bieringer
 Norbert Kentrup as Max Endrich
 Jutta Thomasius as J. Thomasius
 Hans Drawe as Dietzlaff

References

External links
 In Danger and Deep Distress, the Middleway Spells Certain Death at Edgar Reitz' website 
 

1974 films
1970s avant-garde and experimental films
German avant-garde and experimental films
Films directed by Alexander Kluge
Films directed by Edgar Reitz
Films set in Frankfurt
1970s German-language films
West German films
1970s German films